Joel Allegretti is an American poet and fiction writer. His second book of poetry, Father Silicon, was selected by the Kansas City Star as one of 100 Noteworthy Books of 2006. He is the editor of Rabbit Ears: TV Poems (NYQ Books, 2015), the first anthology of poetry about the mass medium.

He has published his work in many U.S. journals and is represented in more than thirty anthologies.
He is a member of the Academy of American Poets and ASCAP.

Poetry
Allegretti's poems have appeared in The New York Quarterly, Barrow Street, Harpur Palate, Smartish Pace, PANK, and many other national journals, as well as in journals published in Canada, the United Kingdom, Belgium, and India.

In addition to writing six books and chapbooks of poetry, he conceived and edited the anthology Rabbit Ears: TV Poems. The Boston Globe called it "cleverly edited" and "a smart exploration of the many, many meanings of TV." Rain Taxi said, "With its diversity of content and poetic form, Rabbit Ears feels more rich and eclectic than any other poetry anthology on the market."

Fiction
Allegretti has published short stories in The MacGuffin ("A Pair of Wings in Search of a Bird"), The Adroit Journal ("Bird-Boy"), Thrice Fiction ("The Intruders"), and The Nassau Review ("Reassignment Surgery: Patient #A-27"), among other literary magazines.

Our Dolphin, a novella about a deformed Italian adolescent and a talking dolphin, appeared in 2016.

Performance Works
His performance texts and theater pieces have been staged at La MaMa, Medicine Show Theatre, the Cornelia Street Cafe, and the Sidewalk Cafe, all in New York. He conceived and co-edited "Dear Yoko: A Tribute to Yoko Ono," a special digital issue of Nerve Lantern, a journal of performance texts and writings about performance.

Musical Works
Allegretti has published conceptual and experimental musical compositions in Maintenant: A Journal of Contemporary Dada Writing & Art and in anthologies from great weather for MEDIA and Thrice Publishing.

He supplied the texts for three song cycles by the late Frank Ezra Levy, whose recorded work is available in the  Naxos American Classics series.

Bibliography 
Poetry Collections

Author
 Platypus (NYQ Books, 2017)
 The Body in Equipoise (Full Court Press, 2014), chapbook
 Europa/Nippon/New York: Poems/Not-Poems (Poets Wear Prada, 2012), chapbook
 Thrum (Poets Wear Prada, 2010), chapbook
 Father Silicon (The Poet's Press, 2006), selected by The Kansas City Star as one of 100 Noteworthy Books of 2006
 The Plague Psalms (The Poet's Press, 2000)

Editor
 Rabbit Ears: TV Poems (NYQ Books, 2015)

Fiction
 Our Dolphin (Thrice Publishing, 2016), novella

Selected Anthologies
 Extraordinary Visions: Stories Inspired by Jules Verne (North American Jules Verne Society/BearManor Media, 2022), "Gabriel at the Jules Verne Traveling Adventure Show"
 I Wanna Be Loved by You: Poems on Marilyn Monroe (Milk & Cake Press, 2022), "Amateur Night at Giselle's Attic: Bette Noire Does Marilyn Monroe"
 Visiting Bob: Poems Inspired by the Life and Work of Bob Dylan (New Rivers Press, 2018), "Epitaph: Edie Sedgwick"
 Suitcase of Chrysanthemums (great weather for MEDIA, 2018), "The Beloved"
 Like Light: 25 Years of Poetry & Prose by Bright Hill Poets & Writers (Bright Hill Press, 2017), "What Stéphane Grappelli Means to Me" and "The Definition of 'Museum' Reconsidered as a Portal to Infinity"
 A Galaxy of Starfish: An Anthology of Modern Surrealism (Salò Press, 2016), "The Body in Equipoise," "Jean Cocteau Spectacles," "The Dark Sea Breaks Heavily - A Reddish Glow Spreads Out in It - A Sea of Blood Foams at My Feet," "The Amphisbaena Reconsidered as Architectural Template," "For Immediate Release: 'House of Goodbye' Opens at Museum of Enteric Representation," and "Towards the Design and Construction of a House in the Shape of Water"
 Tales of Terror: The Supernatural Poem Since 1800, Volume II (The Poet's Press, 2016), "The Sea Serpent" and "Elegy for Erik, Architect of Hopeless Desire, Angel of Music, Opera House Poltergeist"
 Meta-Land: Poets of the Palisades II (The Poet's Press, 2016), "Poem for Mary Shelley" and "The Polka-Dot Wings Adventure"
 My Cruel Invention (Meerkat Press, 2015), "Prepared Piano"
 SHALE: Extreme Fiction for Extreme Conditions (Texture Press, 2015), "The Intruders"
 Van Gogh's Ear - Volume 9 (Crossroad Press, 2015), "The Not-Here"
 The Understanding between Foxes and Light (great weather for MEDIA, 2013), "The La Monte Young Poem"
 Divining Divas (Lethe Press, 2012), "The Belles of Grey Gardens"
 Token Entry: New York City Subway Poems (Smalls Books, 2012), "A Concert"
 Chance of a Ghost: An Anthology of Contemporary Ghost Poems (Helicon Nine Editions, 2005), "Unimpressed with Offenbach, Weary of Rilke, Perplexed by Cocteau, Though Amused by Black Orpheus, Eurydice Reveals Herself to Be the Original Greta Garbo," recipient of an Honorable Mention in the 2006 edition of The Year's Best Fantasy and Horror, published by St. Martin's Griffin

Poems 
"The Arranged Marriage" First Literary Review - East

"The Daybook" Boog City

"The Orchestra of the Hemispheres in Concert" Five:2:One

"Disputably 8th Street," "Focus," "6 P.M. on the BQE," and "Satori in Manhattan"  Sensitive Skin

"Oh, How We Love You, Second Amendment!" Poets Reading the News

untitled text art Poets Reading the News

"Haiku for Banksy" Live Mag!

"Candy Darling" The Opiate

"As I Walked a Wooded Path on a Saturday in June" The Opiate

"For Those Who Seek a Blank Canvas" Storm Cellar

"Main Street, 8:40 A.M." First Literary Review - East

References

External links
 Author's Website

American male poets
Living people
Year of birth missing (living people)
Place of birth missing (living people)